Blanche Robinson (Mrs. Martin Hennion Robinson, née Williams; 18 May 1883, near Liberty, Kansas – 19 August 1969, Los Angeles) was an American composer and well-known piano accompanist.  During her prolific years as a composer, she lived in New York City.  During her more active years as a piano accompanist, she lived in Los Angeles.  In her published music, she was known as Mrs. M. Hennion Robinson or Mrs. M. Hennion-Robinson.

Two Blanche Robinsons & two Blanche Williams of the same era

Music career 
Before she became a teenager, Robinson began accepting engagements in concert work, and under the management of Mr. Pardee and Miss Weber toured the Middle West in recital as concert pianist. In 1901 her father's business called him to California, and the family moved to Los Angeles.

For nearly three years after arriving in Los Angeles, Robinson did concert work and was soloist on many notable programs. Around 1904, Robinson began specializing exclusively in accompaniment. She accompanied artists that included George Hamlin, Jeannie Jornelli, Marcella Craft, Maggie Teyte, Heimo Haitto, and Pavlowa, Franz Wilcez and Hugo Herrman.  For nine years she was the accompanist for the Woman's Lyric Club, and for five years of the Ellis Club.

Robinson became a pupil in composition of Frederick Stephenson in Los Angeles. Her The Woman at Home, a chorus for women's voices, was performed with much success by the Lyric Club. Among her better-known compositions are Songs of You, The Mystic Hour, Youth, Fairies, Butterflies, The Dawn of Dawns, and a chorus for men's voices, A Song for Heroes. She performed under the management of Mr. Behymer in concert work.  She also performed with Ebell Club, the Friday Morning Club, the Gamut Club, and many leading artists who toured Los Angeles.

Family 
 Father:  Oliver David Williams (1854 Kentucky – 1932, Venice, California)
 Mother:  Joanna Williams, née Dickerson (25 Oct 1855 Crawfordsville, Indiana – Oct 1949, Venice, California)
 Husband:  Martin Hennion Robinson (18 January 1878 Missouri – 2 May 1964 Los Angeles) and Blanche Williams were married September 27, 1904, in Los Angeles, at the Central Methodist Episcopal Church, Los Angeles.

Robinson died August 19, 1969, in Los Angeles.  Her ashes are stored at Woodlawn Memorial Cemetery, Santa Monica, next to those of her daughter Dorothy B. Robinson (1906 Los Angeles – 2004), also a pianist.

Music club and sorority affiliations 
Both Blanche Robinson and her daughter, Dorothy Robinson, were members of The Dominant Club, a Los Angeles charitable club of women musicians founded in 1906 that promotes women in classical music and chamber music.  Blanche Robinson was a charter member and past president of The Dominant Club.

In 1928, Blanche Robinson was inducted as an honorary member of Sigma Alpha Iota (ΣΑΙ), Sigma Xi Chapter of the University of California, Los Angeles.  ΣΑΙ is an international fraternity for women in music.

Early education 
At age nine, Robinson's family moved to Chicago; there, she began eight-years of study with William Charles Ernest Seeboeck (21 August 1859 Vienna, Austria – 1907 Chicago), a gifted pianist and composer who had been a student of Anton Rubinstein (1829–1894).

Selected compositions 

 "Love Was a Beggar," written for Mary McCormic, music by Robinson
 "Love's Trilogy," a song for four-part chorus of women's voices, words by E. Sterrett, music by Robinson, G. Schirmer (1925) 
 "The Fairies," words & music by Robinson, G. Schirmer (1926) 
 "The Woman at Home," a chorus for women's voices
 "Songs of You"
 "The Mystic Hour"
 "Youth," music by Robinson, words by Mrs. Louise Stedman Bostick 
 "Butterflies"
 "The Dawn of Dawns," music by Robinson, words by Ina Donna Coolbrith 
 "The Chudder Weaver," for high or medium voice, music by Robinson, words by Frances Hull Topping (b. 1879), G. Schirmer (©July 3, 1937) 
 "Two pictures," for voice and piano, G. Schirmer (©1924) LCCN unk84197289 
 "The Lover's Errand"

Ellis Club of Los Angeles Collection of Musical Arrangements and Papers
Processed by the staff of the Dept. of Music Special Collections, UCLA
UCLA Library, Performing Arts Special Collections Online Archive of California

 "Baffled," in C minor, music by Robinson (TTBB - voice parts only); words by Helen Combes (mimeograph, n.d.) (©May 31, 1932), Harms, Inc. 
 "Marmela," music by Robinson (TTBB, voice parts only); words by Mabel W. Phillips (mimeograph, n.d.)
 "A Song for Heroes," music by Robinson (TTBB), words by Edwin Markham (mimeograph, n.d.)
 "King Robert of Sicily," music by Robinson (SATB with narration; chorus parts only); words by Henry Wadsworth Longfellow (mimeograph, n.d.)
 "Liebestraum," by Franz Liszt, arrangement (TTBB) and words by Robinson (mimeograph, n.d.)

Discography

Participation in a judges panel to select a California state song 
In 1921, Lynden Ellsworth Behymer (1862–1947), impresario, and Bessie Bartlett Frankel (Mrs. Cecil Frankel), donated a sum of money to the California Federation of Music Clubs to hold a contest for lyrics to a state song "of real value." The judges were Benjamin Franklin Field (1868–1960), chairman of the federation and chairman of the committee of judges, Grace Atherton Dennen (1874–1927), editor and publisher of The Lyric West, and Blanche Robinson. The judges selected Mary Lennox of San Francisco on January 17, 1922, as the winner for her composition, California, Sweet Homeland of Mine.

References 

1883 births
1969 deaths
Women classical composers
American classical pianists
American women classical pianists
Burials at Woodlawn Memorial Cemetery, Santa Monica
20th-century American women pianists
20th-century classical pianists
20th-century American pianists